KHKE is a radio station owned and operated by the University of Northern Iowa in Cedar Falls, Iowa, United States, which broadcasts on 89.5 MHz. It is a classical station, sharing broadcast facilities with KUNI.  It is now a part of Iowa Public Radio, operating with the other two public radio station clusters at the University of Iowa and Iowa State University.

Ice storm and tower collapse
On February 24 2007 the upper half of the KHKE tower collapsed due to an ice storm.  The remaining lower half was later demolished, and the tower was scheduled to be rebuilt in Summer 2007.

References

External links
Iowa Public Radio

Classical music radio stations in the United States
HKE
HKE
NPR member stations
HKE
Radio stations established in 1974
1974 establishments in Iowa